Travis Bowen (born August 4, 1989) is an American soccer player who plays as a forward.

References

External links

 
Spanish football stats

1989 births
Living people
American soccer players
Oxnard College alumni
Ventura County Fusion players
Portland Timbers U23s players
Phoenix FC players
LA Galaxy II players
FC Golden State Force players
Detroit City FC players
Soccer players from California
USL League Two players
USL Championship players
National Premier Soccer League players
Association football forwards
American expatriate sportspeople in North Macedonia
American expatriate sportspeople in Spain